Pamfil Polonic (27 August 1858 – 17 April 1945) was a Romanian archaeologist and topographer.

Notes 

People from Suceava
Romanian archaeologists
20th-century Romanian historians
1858 births
1943 deaths
19th-century Romanian historians